Great Karimun, also known as Nuwi Island, is one of the islands in the Riau Islands province of Indonesia, administratively part of Karimun Regency. It lies about 37 km southwest of Singapore, 54 km west of Batam, 24 km northeast of Rangsang Island and 32 km north of Kundur Island.

History
In the past, Great Karimun Island was the destination of foreign traders and the Malay Kings. Sixteenth century Portuguese reports claimed that the island was inhabited, possibly by the Orang Laut. In the 18th and 19th centuries, the island was part of the Johor Sultanate then the Riau-Lingga Sultanate.

Around 1615 agents of the Dutch East India Company (VOC) inspected the northwestern coast of the island for the possible construction of a fortification. The proposed fort, however, was never built. Two centuries later, Colonel William Farquhar surveyed the island after receiving permission from the Bugis Raja Muda of Johor, Raja Ja'afar. Although Karimun was deemed to be of great strategic value at the confluence of the Singapore and Melaka Straits, it was found to have insufficient sources fresh water to sustain a British trading post and a settlement.

Geography 

The island's main city is Tanjung Balai Karimun. As at the 2020 Census, the regency of Karimun had a population of 253,457 with the majority of the people living in Great Karimun. Notable landmarks on the island include Mount Jantan, the beaches of Pelawan and Pongkar, and the Pongkar Waterfall.

Economics 
The island has strategic geographical importance, as it is near the Straits of Malacca, an international shipping route. As the island is strategically located at the border of Singapore and Johor (in Malaysia), Karimun being a part of the Riau Islands also is included the SIJORI Growth Triangle partnership. SIJORI (Singapore-Johor-Riau Islands) Growth Triangle is a strategic partnership among Singapore, Johor and Riau Islands that combine the individual and collective strength to improve the subregion attractiveness to investors from both the region and international. SIJORI links the infrastructure, capital, expertise and rich culture of Singapore with the natural resources, lands and labour resources of Johor and Riau Islands.

However, due to the stronger ties between Singapore and Malaysia, Karimun is losing its economic attraction to Singaporean investments. Another reason for the loss in attractiveness is the lack of adequate infrastructure in Karimun, especially electricity supply and the lack of transparency in the government administration.

Natural resources 

Due to large scale indiscriminate fishing activity near the island recently, fish stocks have been depleted, and thus the fishing businesses have declined considerably.

The main export of the island is its granite which is one of the best quality in the world.

Sand has also been constantly exported, mainly to Singapore for land reclamation. Indonesian has however limited sand exports over concerns with Singapore's reclamation projects, and banned them outright in the beginning of 2007.

See also
 Little Karimun, a smaller island just northeast of Great Karimun
 Karimun Jawa, an unrelated archipelago off the north coast of Java

References

External links

Riau Archipelago
Populated places in Indonesia